GP5 could refer to several things:

 GP5 (gene)
 T7 phage, or Gp5
 GP5 chip, computer chip
 GP-5 gas mask, Soviet  civilian gas mask